Ali Fallahian (born 23 October 1949) is an Iranian politician and cleric. He served as intelligence minister from 1989 to 1997 under the presidency of Ali Akbar Rafsanjani.

Early life and education
Fallahian was born in Najafabad, Iran, in 1945. He is a graduate of Haqqani school in Qom.

Career
In 1987, Fallahian was appointed by Ruhollah Khomeini as chief prosecutor of the Special Court for the Clergy and led the trial against Mehdi Hashemi.

Fallahian served as a member of the 3rd Assembly of Experts of the Islamic Republic of Iran. He was also the minister of intelligence in the cabinet of then President Rafsanjani from 1989 to 1997. After Fallahian left office, his senior deputy, Saeed Emami, was arrested for the murders of four dissidents in 1998 and 1999, Emami subsequently died in prison in what the authorities declared a suicide. Fallahian began to work in the office of the Supreme Leader, Ali Khamenei.

Presidential candidacy
Fallahian was a candidate in the 2001 presidential election, which was won by incumbent reformist Mohammad Khatami. Fallahian came in sixth place, receiving 0.2 percent of the vote; some observers have hypothesized that the cleric only entered the election in an effort to clear his name, which has been associated with murder and political suppression.

On 19 February 2013, in Birjand, Fallahian announced his candidacy for the Iranian presidential election, saying that "people's requests to me [had] reached a threshold". Running with the campaign slogan of "Advanced Islamic Country", he said that his top priority would be the economy, focusing on fighting inflation and lowering the unemployment rate. He specified that he planned on continuing the subsidy reform plan, which many experts fault for undermining local businesses and the economy.

Regarding diplomatic relations with the United States, he implied that he would seek improved ties, even suggesting to put an end to the uranium enrichment program, saying "enough of nuclear", as Iran had "already mastered its knowledge". He added that he envisioned a "bright horizon" for cooperation between the two countries, especially in creating stability in Afghanistan, Iraq, Tunisia, and Egypt. His nomination was rejected by the Guardian Council.

Accusations
Fallahian is currently on the official wanted list of Interpol in connection with the bombing of the Asociación Mutual Israelita Argentina (AMIA), a Jewish Community Center in Buenos Aires, Argentina, on 18 July 1994, that killed 85 people. The Interpol issued a red notice for him and other suspects for their alleged roles in the attack in March 2007. The arrest warrant is based on the allegation that senior Iranian officials planned the attack in an August 1993 meeting, including Khamanei, the Supreme Leader, Mohammad Hejazi, the then Khamanei's intelligence and security advisor, Rafsanjani, then president, Fallahian, then intelligence minister, and Ali Akbar Velayati, then foreign minister.

In addition, he was the subject of an international arrest warrant issued in 1997 in connection with the murder of three Kurdish-Iranian opposition leaders in the Mykonos restaurant assassinations. Fallahian is under an international warrant issued in 1996 by German court because of his role in the assassinations. Sadeq Sharafkandi from Kurdistan Democratic Party of Iran and three of his colleagues were assassinated September 1992 in Berlin by Iranian-Lebanese agents. Fallahian was also the most prominent member of a group of five Iranians and Lebanese for whom international arrest warrants issued in March 2007.

He was also named by investigative reporter Akbar Ganji as the "master key" of the 1998 "Chain Murders" of four dissident Iranian intellectuals. In December 2000, appearing before an Islamic Revolutionary Court, investigative reporter Akbar Ganji "ending months of guessing and expectations from both the authorities and the public" when he announced the "Master Key" to the chain murders of four dissident Iranian intellectuals was Fallahian.

Fallahian is also charged by a Swiss court with masterminding the assassination of Kazem Rajavi, a brother of Mujahedin-e Khalq leader Massoud Rajavi, near Geneva in broad daylight by several agents on 24 April 1990. An international arrest warrant has been issued against him and as a result, he is unable to leave the country.

See also 
 Chain murders of Iran

References

External links

 Former intelligence minister Ali Fallahian under house arrest
 Iran's State of Terror

1945 births
Living people
Iranian Shia clerics
People from Najafabad
Members of the Assembly of Experts
Candidates in the 2001 Iranian presidential election
Islamic Republican Party politicians
Ministers of Intelligence of Iran